Ashland High School is a public high school in Ashland, Massachusetts.

History
Established in the nineteenth century, Ashland High School is home of the Clockers. Ashland High athletic teams have competed within the Tri-Valley League since the early 1970s, when they left the Dual County League. A new school building opened in 2005. In 2009, the school had probable cases of the swine flu pandemic. On September 21, 2020, the school hosted a first-round game of the 2020 U.S. Open Cup qualification soccer tournament.

Demographics

Notable alumni
Dave Blass (1986), production designer
Douglas R. Green (1973), biologist
Dick Muri (1971), politician

See also
List of high schools in Massachusetts

References

External links

Ashland, Massachusetts
Schools in Middlesex County, Massachusetts
Public high schools in Massachusetts